The 3rd Toronto International Film Festival (TIFF) took place in Toronto, Ontario, Canada between September 14 and September 21, 1978. It showcased 85 films, the lowest number of films in the festival's history. In Praise of Older Women directed by George Kaczender was selected as the opening film. When the Ontario Film Review Board objected to a 40-second scene between Marilyn Lightstone and Tom Berenger, co-producer of the film Robert Lantos cut the scene for the theatrical run. Despite that, some of the TIFF staff managed to smuggle original uncut version of the film and run it into the theatre. The news was well publicised, increasing interest in the film, in turn boosting ticket sales. Difficulties arose when audiences waiting outside the theatre noticed that each ticket admitted two person thus causing anger in the crowd. The audience who were not able to get seats during the first screening were invited to a later screening. The People's Choice Award was introduced this year, which is given to a feature film chosen by a vote of the festival audience.

Louis Malle's film Pretty Baby was banned by the OFRB, due to its sensitive subject matter.

Awards

Programme

Gala Presentation
Girlfriends by Claudia Weill
The Chant of Jimmie Blacksmith by Fred Schepisi
Midnight Express by Alan Parker
The Cycle by Dariush Mehrjui
In Search of Anna by Esben Storm
Pourquoi pas! by Coline Serreau

Canadian Cinema
In Praise of Older Women by George Kaczender
Marie-Anne by Martin Walters
The Third Walker by Teri McLuhan
Three Card Monte by Les Rose

Documentaries
Roger Corman: Hollywood's Wild Angel by Christian Blackwood
The Last Tasmanian by Tom Haydon

References

External links
 Official site
 TIFF: A Reel History: 1976 - 2012
1978 Toronto International Film Festival at IMDb

1978
1978 film festivals
1978 in Toronto
1978 in Canadian cinema